XHPLEO-FM is a radio station on 88.5 FM in Huajuapan de León, Oaxaca. It is owned by the Vera Hernández family and is known as La GranDiosa de Huajuapan.

History
XHPLEO was awarded in the IFT-4 radio auction of 2017 and came to air in April 2018. The Vera Hernández family, which owns the concessionaires of XHPIXT-FM as well as XHPSEB-FM in Santiago Juxtlahuaca and XHPIXT-FM in Asunción Nochixtlán, is involved in the leather business.

References

External links
La Grandiosa 88.5 Facebook

Radio stations in Oaxaca
Radio stations established in 2018
2018 establishments in Mexico